Corner Island is located in Corner Inlet Marine National Park, approximately  north of Millers Landing on Wilsons Promontory in Victoria, Australia.  The island is accessible only at high tide by boat.

External links
Parks Victoria - Corner Inlet Marine National Park

Islands of Victoria (Australia)
Wilsons Promontory